Manuk is an uninhabited volcanic island located in the Banda Sea, Indonesia.

Manuk and its variances Manouk, Manoog and Manoug are also common Armenian given names meaning child and/or infant.

Manuk and variants may also refer to:

Places
Manuk River, river in northern Java, Indonesia

People

Manuk
Manuk Bey or Manuc Bey (real name Emanuel Mârzayan) (1769–1817), Armenian merchant, diplomat and inn-keeper
Manuk Abeghian (1865–1944), scholar of Armenian literature and folklore
Manuk Kakosyan (born 1974), Armenian Russian professional football player

Manouk
Manouk Avedissian or Bechara Effendi (1841–1925), Ottoman administrator and the chief engineer of the Vilayet of Syria and later of the Vilayet of Beirut
Manouk Petrosian or Mekhitar of Sebaste (1674–1749), Armenian Catholic monk and a prominent theologian who founded the Mekhitarist Order

Manoug
Manoug Exerjian (1898–1974), American Armenian architect
Manoug Manougian, Lebanese Armenian scientist, professor, and father of the Lebanese space program
Manoug Parikian (1920–1987), British Armenian concert violinist and violin professor

Others
Manuk Napinadar or Chicken Napinadar, typical Batak cuisine in Indonesia that is usually served at certain customary feasts

See also
Manukyan, a surname based on the given name

Armenian masculine given names